Washington University Libraries is the library system of Washington University in St. Louis. The system includes 12 libraries and over 5.5 million volumes. The John M. Olin Library is the central library.

Olin Library
Centrally located on the Danforth Campus, just west of the Brookings Quadrangle, Olin Library houses general-interest materials and collections in the humanities, social sciences, biology, mathematics and engineering. It is also a designated federal depository library and houses over 70,000 microfilms. Special collections include the literary papers of James Merrill, Samuel Beckett, Howard Nemerov, Stanley Elkin, William Gass, Mona Van Duyn, and many other important writers; the Washington University Film & Media Archive includes material created by alumnus Henry Hampton documenting the Civil Rights Movement.

Built in the early 1960s after a gift from John M. Olin and opened in 1962, the John M. Olin Library replaced the University's former main library at Ridgley Hall. In 2004, the Olin Library was rededicated after a comprehensive  renovation and an expansion of the main floor. This process took more than three years. The library contains a cafe/coffee shop, study spaces for graduate and undergraduate students, and many general services and administrative offices of the Washington University Libraries.

Washington University Film & Media Archive 
The Washington University Film & Media Archive is an archive composed of completed films and videos, most notably Eyes on the Prize the definitive documentary on America's civil rights movement. The archive also holds numerous materials that went into the creation of other works. The Archive collects photos, interviews, stock footage, producer's research notes, correspondence, treatments, and scripts, all of which provide a distinctive look at the film making at storytelling process for scholars, teachers, filmmakers, and students.

Opened in the Fall of 2002, the Film & Media Archive's first acquisition was the Henry Hampton Collection, an archive of the work of one of the most influential African-American filmmakers. For the first time ever, the tens of thousands of materials created by his company Blackside, Inc. during the production process became available for study.

The Archive has expanded from its inaugural collection to include the collection of filmmaker Bill Miles, the St. Louis Public School's educational films, and material from Insignia Films' Reporting America at War series. It continues to grow, focusing on collecting film archives that examine the great social movements of American history and African-American life and culture, and supporting documentary studies. In addition to acquiring collections of major historical importance, the Archive preserves and organizes these materials, publicizes them, and creates related educational and outreach programs.

Documenting Ferguson 
Following the Shooting of Michael Brown, Washington University Libraries implemented a crowd-sourced digital repository to collected ephemeral documentation of the Ferguson unrest called "Documenting Ferguson". The collection accepts submissions of written testimony, images, and video related to the protests.

Bernard Becker Medical Library
Located on the Washington University School of Medicine campus, Becker Library serves the Washington University School of Medicine, the Barnes-Jewish Hospital, and the St. Louis Children's Hospital. The mission of the Becker Medical Library is to provide information resources and technology in support of the educational, research and patient care objectives of the School of Medicine. The library contains over 146,000 volumes, along with over 9,100 print and electronic journal titles.

Becker Medical Library is organized into several departments which play unique roles in serving the Washington University School of Medicine community, including: Archives and Rare Books, Collection Management Services, Health Information Resources (Reference), and Translational Research Support.

Leadership
Shirley K. Baker served as dean of Washington University Libraries from 1989 until her retirement on June 30, 2012. Her replacement, Jeffrey Trzeciak, served from July 1, 2012 until July 21, 2016. After being led on an interim basis by Marion G. Crain, a Vice Provost and Professor of Law at Washington University, Denise Stephens took over as University Librarian and Vice Provost on June 15, 2017.

Specialty libraries
 Kenneth and Nancy Kranzberg Art & Architecture Library - serves the Sam Fox School of Design & Visual Arts and the Department of Art History & Archaeology.
 Kopolow Business Library - serves the  Olin Business School. Databases provided by Moody's, Standard & Poor's, Hoover's, and Disclosure; receives comprehensive real-time stock and other market information through the Bloomberg and Bridge Information Systems; maintains a book collection of around 30,000 volumes and subscriptions to more than 400 major business journals, magazines, and newspapers.
 Chemistry Library - serves mainly the Chemistry Department and other university science departments. The library provides access to many print and online industry journals, including those published by the American Chemical Society, Elsevier, and Wiley.
 Digital Gateway - serves as a single point of entry for discovery of all digital collections available at WUSTL, provides a similar single point of entry for anyone in the WUSTL community interested in developing digital projects.
 Ronald Rettner Earth and Planetary Sciences Library
 East Asian Library - serves the information and research needs of the WUSTL East Asian Studies Program. The East Asian Library consists almost entirely of materials in the Chinese, Japanese, and Korean languages, with over 140,000 volumes. Special holdings include the Robert S. Elegant Collection; primarily the assorted files of clippings of newspapers, magazines, and news releases covering the period of the Chinese Cultural Revolution; Nelson Wu's collection on East Asian art, architecture, and Chinese culture; and the Thomas Temple Hoopes' collection on Japanese sword and Japanese art history.
 Law Library - the law library of Washington University School of Law. Houses strong collections in the areas of tax law urban law, environmental law, land use planning, Chinese law, Japanese law, and international law; an official depository for federal documents published by the Government Printing Office and a depository for government publications of the state of Missouri. Contains over 650,000 volumes and volume equivalents.
 Gaylord Music Library - a music library holds over 100,500 books and scores, 40,500 recordings and tapes, 5,200 microform items and more than 24,000 pieces of sheet music, with strong holdings in Americana, Festschriften, early music, opera, and music literature. Special collections include the Tyson Collection of 168 Mozart and 100 Beethoven first and early editions.
 Gustavus A. Pfeiffer Physics Library - contains book and serial publications supporting the Physics Department. Actively collected materials include the areas of astrophysics, mathematical physics, condensed matter, elementary particles, probability theory, statistical mechanics, many-body systems, low temperature, high pressure, material physics, and ultrasonic physics.
 Social Work Library - houses  social work materials, including 50,000 books, journals, publications and videos; periodical holdings consist of more than 450 current subscriptions; adds more than 1,000 bound volumes to the collection each year; strong collections in the fields of child welfare, community development, family therapy, mental health, children and youth, gerontology, public welfare, management of human services, and social policy.
Special Collections consists of five units including Washington University Film & Media Archive, Manuscripts, Modern Graphic History Library, Rare Books, and University Archives
 West Campus Library - contains monographs, journals, folio books, government documents, maps, recordings, and microforms. Notable collections include all titles published prior to 1801 that are not part of Special Collections and a significant portion of the University's Government Document holdings. This facility also houses a number of library offices.

References 

Library
University and college academic libraries in the United States
Federal depository libraries
Libraries in Missouri
1853 establishments in Missouri